The 2013 Auto Club 400 was a NASCAR Sprint Cup Series stock car race held on March 24, 2013, at Auto Club Speedway in Fontana, California, United States. Contested over 200 laps on the 2-mile (3.2 km) asphalt D-shaped oval, it was the fifth race of the 2013 Sprint Cup Series championship. Kyle Busch of Joe Gibbs Racing won the race, his first of the season, and the first Sprint Cup win at Auto Club for Joe Gibbs, completing a weekend sweep, while Dale Earnhardt Jr. finished second. Joey Logano, Carl Edwards and Kurt Busch rounded out the top five.

Report

Background

The track's turns are banked from fourteen degrees, while the front stretch, the location of the finish line, is banked at eleven degrees. Unlike the front stretch, the backstraightaway is banked at three degrees. The track has a seating capacity of 92,100 people.

Before the race, Brad Keselowski was leading the Drivers' Championship with 166 points,  while Dale Earnhardt Jr. stood in second with 157 points. Jimmie Johnson followed in the third position, 23 points ahead of Clint Bowyer and 25 points ahead of Greg Biffle in fourth and fifth. Denny Hamlin, with 125, was one point ahead of Kasey Kahne and Carl Edwards, as Paul Menard was three points ahead of Kyle Busch and Ricky Stenhouse Jr. in tenth and eleventh. Joey Logano completed the first twelve positions with 104 points. The defending winner of the race was Tony Stewart, who won the race in 2012.

Practice and qualifying

Three practice sessions were held before the race. The first session, held on March 22, 2013, was 60 minutes long. The second and third were held on March 23, and were 55 and 50 minutes long. During the first practice session, Bowyer was quickest with a time of 38.832, ahead of Hamlin and A. J. Allmendinger in second and third. Kyle Busch followed in the fourth position, ahead of Logano in fifth.

In the Saturday morning session, Biffle was quickest, ahead of Allmendinger and Busch in second and third. Hamlin and Kurt Busch followed in the fourth and fifth positions. Bowyer, Mark Martin, Earnhardt Jr., Martin Truex Jr., and Logano rounded out the first ten positions. In the final practice session for the race, Martin was quickest with a time of 39.269 seconds. Bowyer followed in second, ahead of Matt Kenseth and Johnson in third and fourth. Keselowski, who was eighteenth quickest in second practice, managed fifth.

During qualifying, forty-three cars were entered, meaning all of the cars were able to start because of NASCAR's qualifying procedure. Hamlin clinched his twelfth career pole position, with a time of 38.410 seconds. After his qualifying run, Hamlin commented,“Honestly, I think our car was really fast. I knew, talking to a few people in my motor home... it’s cocky to say, but I said, ‘Man, I can almost guarantee a pole, if we have a late draw.’ When they told me we were third, I was like, ‘OK. Well, just never mind. Forget that." He was joined on the front row of the grid by Biffle. Keselowski qualified third, Kyle Busch took fourth, and Kenseth started fifth. Logano, Truex Jr., Tony Stewart, Martin, and Kurt Busch completed the first ten positions on the grid.

Race
With seven laps to go, Joey Logano took the lead after a brief duel with former teammates Kyle Busch and Denny Hamlin. Hamlin and Logano had been involved in an incident the previous race at Bristol, with the sentiments carrying over to this race. Hamlin chased Logano down and the two were side-by-side for most of the final lap, but Logano attempted to block Hamlin in the final turn and was sent up into the outside wall, while Hamlin came off the banking and smashed head-on into the inside concrete retaining wall, allowing Busch to pass both cars on the high side and take the win.

Although Hamlin climbed out of the car right after the crash, he immediately collapsed and lied on the track. He was airlifted to the hospital as a precaution. It was announced the next day that Hamlin had suffered a massive L1 compression fracture, or a collapsed vertebra, likely because the area where his car hit the wall was lacking a SAFER barrier. The resulting injuries forced Hamlin to miss the next four races. Mark Martin filled in for Hamlin at Martinsville while Brian Vickers filled in at Texas, Kansas, and Richmond. Hamlin did not start another race until Talladega in May, although the team arranged for Vickers to take over at the first caution flag pit stop. Hamlin did not return full-time to his race car until the following week at Darlington.

In response to the accident, for 2014, Auto Club Speedway installed an additional 1,000 foot SAFER barrier along the wall where Hamlin's car had impacted.

Following the finish, Logano was also involved in an altercation with Stewart after a blocking move made by Logano on Stewart during the final restart. Stewart ended with a 22nd-place finish following the incident. Stewart went on to confront Logano in the pit lane and who had to be restrained by crews from Danica Patrick's team after Logano threw a water bottle at Stewart.

Results

Qualifying

Race results

Standings after the race

Drivers' Championship standings

Manufacturers' Championship standings

Note: Only the first twelve positions are included for the driver standings.

References

Auto Club 400
Auto Club 400
Auto Club 400
NASCAR races at Auto Club Speedway